Sakyadhita International Association of Buddhist Women is a 501(c)3 nonprofit organization founded in 1987 at the conclusion of its first conference and registered in California in the United States in 1988. Sakyadhita holds an international conference every two years, bringing together laypeople, nuns, and monks from different countries and traditions around the world.

History
The organization was founded in 1987 in Bodhgaya, India. Sakyadhita is an alliance of women and men founded at the conclusion of the first International Conference on Buddhist Women, held in Bodh Gaya, where the 14th Dalai Lama was the keynote speaker. The term sakyadhita means "daughters of the Buddha" and was first used at the conference. The initiative for creating the organization came from Ayya Khema, Karma Lekshe Tsomo, Dr. Chatsumarn Kabilsingh (now Dhammananda Bhikkhuni) and Carola Roloff (now Bhikṣuni Jampa Tsedroen). Currently, Sakyadhita has almost 2000 members in 45 countries around the world. National branches of Sakyadhita have been established in  Australia, Canada, France, Germany, Korea, Nepal, Portugal, Spain, Taiwan, the United Kingdom, and the United States. New branches are currently being formed in Indonesia, Malaysia, Mongolia, Russia, and Vietnam.

Conferences
An international conference is held every two years. The conference brings together laypersons and nuns from different countries and traditions, to share their experiences, research, and to encourage projects to improve conditions for Buddhist women—especially in developing countries. Since 1987, Sakyadhita has held 13 international conferences on Buddhist women in Asia and three in North America. The conferences feature papers, workshops, and performances on topics relevant to Buddhist women. The global gatherings are open to all, regardless of gender, ethnicity, or religion. The 14th Sakyadhita conference was held in 2015 in Yogjakarta, Indonesia. The 15th Sakyadhita conference was held in 2017 in Hong Kong. The 16th conference was held in Australia, and the 17th conference will be held online.

International
 1987    Bodhgaya, India, "Buddhist Nuns in Society", Keynote by the 14th Dalai Lama
 1991    Bangkok, Thailand,  "Buddhist Women in the Modern World," Keynote by Chancellor of Thammasat University
 1993    Colombo, Sri Lanka, "Buddhist Women in Modern Society," Keynote by Ranasinghe Premadasa, President of Sri Lanka
 1995    Ladakh, India, "Women and the Power of Compassion: Survival in the 21st Century," Keynote by Rani Sarla, Queen of Ladakh
 1997-1998   Phnom Penh, Cambodia, "Women in Buddhism: Unity and Diversity," Keynote by Queen Norodom Siranouk, Queen of Cambodia
 2000    Lumbini, Nepal, "Women as Peacemakers: Self, Family, Community, World," Keynote by Minister of Culture and Sport
 2002    Taipei, Taiwan, "Bridging Worlds," Keynote by Annette Shu-lien Lu, Vice President of the Republic of China
 2004   Seoul, South Korea,  "Discipline and Practice of Buddhist Women Past and Present," Keynotes by Kwangwoo Sunim, Anne Carolyn Klein, Paula Arai
 2006   Kuala Lumpur, Malaysia, "Buddhist Women in a Global Multicultural Community," Keynote by Sharon Suh
 2008   Ulaanbataar, Mongolia, "Buddhism in Transition: Tradition, Changes, and Challenges,″ Keynotes by Shundō Aoyama Rōshi and Myeong Seong Sunim
 2009-2010   Ho Chi Minh City, Vietnam, "Eminent Buddhist Women," Keynote by C. Julia Huang
 2011   Bangkok, Thailand, "Leading to Liberation," Keynote by Princess Srirasmi of Thailand
 2013   Vaishali, India, "Buddhism at the Grassroots," Keynote by Thich Nu Khiet Minh
 2015   Yogyakarta, Indonesia, "Compassion and Social Justice," Keynote by Karma Lekshe Tsomo
 2017   Hong Kong, “Contemporary Buddhist Women: Contemplation, Cultural Exchange & Social Action,” Keynote by Rongdao Lai
 2019   Australia, "New Horizons in Buddhism," Keynote by Susan Murphy, Roshi

United States
 1988  Santa Barbara, California, "Buddhism Through American Women’s Eyes"
 1996  Claremont, California, "Unity and Diversity"
 2005  Northampton, Massachusetts, "Women Practicing Buddhism: American Experiences"

Publications
Sakyadhita has published an annual newsletter since 1990. Papers presented at the Sakyadhita International Conferences on Buddhist Women have been published in a series of books edited by Karma Lekshe Tsomo: Sakyadhita: Daughters of the Buddha (1989), Buddhism Through American Women's Eyes (1994), Buddhist Women Across Cultures: Realizations (1999), Innovative Buddhist Women: Swimming Against the Stream (2000), Buddhist Women and Social Justice: Ideals, Challenges, and Achievements (2004), Bridging Worlds: Buddhist Women’s Voices Across Generations (2004), Out of the Shadows: Socially Engaged Buddhist Women (2006), Buddhist Women in a Global Multicultural Community (2008), Eminent Buddhist Women (2014), Compassion and Social Justice (2015), and Contemporary Buddhist Women: Contemplation, Cultural Exchange & Social Action. A number of these books have been translated into other languages, including Chinese, German, Indonesian, Korean, and Vietnamese.

See also
 Therīgāthā
 Bhikkhuni
 Thilashin
 Maechi
 Siladhara Order
 Buddhist feminism
 Engaged Buddhism
 Women in Buddhism
 Sangha

References

Footnotes

Further reading
 Banks, Ellison, ed. Women's Buddhism, Buddhism's Women -- Tradition, Revision, Renewal  pp. 97–101. Somerville, MA: Wisdom Publications, 2000 
 Berkeley Center for Religion, Peace and World Affairs, http://berkleycenter.georgetown.edu/resources/organizations/sakyadhita
 Buffetrille, Katia, ed. pp. 113–118. Leiden: Koninklijke Prill, 2012. 
 Chodron, Thubten http://www.thubtenchodron.org/BuddhistNunsMonasticLife/ordination_sakyadhita_heritage_from_the_buddha.html#r3
 Dalai Lama, The message of support from HHDL for the 7th conference: http://www.dalailama.com/messages/buddhism/buddhist-women
 European Buddhist Union, http://www.e-b-u.org/members/member-organisations/sakyadhita-france/
 Fenn, Mavis L. and Kay Koppedrayer, "Sakyadhita: A Transnational Gathering Place for Buddhist Women," Journal of Global Buddhism 9(2008) p. 45–79. ISSN 1527-6457
 French, Rebecca. "Daughters of the Buddha: The Sakyadhita Movement, Buddhist Law, and the Position of Buddhist Nuns."  In Feminism, Law, and Religion. Edited by Marie A. Failinger, Elizabeth R. Schiltz, and Susan J. Stabile. pp. 371–89. Farnham, Surrey, U.K.: Ashgate Publishing, 2013.   (NL)
 Halafoff, Anna, and Praveena Rajkobal. “Sakyadhita International: Gender Equity in Ultramodern Buddhism.” Feminist Theology: The Journal of the Britain & Ireland School of Feminist Theology 23:2(2015) 111-127.
 Mohr, Thea. Weibliche Identität und Leerheit: Eine Ideengeschichtliche Rekonstruktion der Buddhistischen Frauenbewegung Sakyadhita International. Frankfurt am Main: Peter Lang, 2002. 
 Tsomo, Karma Lekshe, ed. Sakyadhita: Daughters of the Buddha. Ithaca, NY: Snow Lion Publications, 1989  (reprinted in Delhi: Indian Books Centre, 1998) (German edition, Dochter des Buddhas). 
 Tsomo, Karma Lekshe. "Sakyadhita Pilgrimage in Asia: On the Trail of the Buddhist Women’s Movement." Nova Religio 10:3 (2006) 102-116.
 Wurst, Rotraut. Identitaet im Exil: Tibetisch-Buddhistische Nonnen and Netzwerk Sakyadhita. Berlin: Dietrich Reimer Verlag, 2001.
 Women in Buddhism: Unity and Diversity 1988 (31-minute video) https://web.archive.org/web/20121204014122/http://bhikkhu.webs.com/apps/videos/videos/view/prev?channel_id=3208215&from_id=15178708 (9 minute clip)

External links
 

Buddhist organizations based in the United States
Buddhist women's organizations
Religious organizations established in 1987
Buddhism in California